Francis Bellamy (1855–1931) was an American Christian minister and author, best known for writing the original version of the U.S. Pledge of Allegiance.

Francis Bellamy is also the name of:
Francis Bellamy (cricketer) (1909–1969), New Zealand cricketer
Francis Rufus Bellamy (1886–1972), American author, novelist and editor

See also
Frank Bellamy (1917–1976), British comics artist